nextmedia Pty Limited (styled as nextmedia) is an Australian media company which publishes special interest magazines in the sport, humor, and hobby (among others). The company is headquartered in Sydney and owned by The Forum Media Group, a German-based B2B and B2C publisher.

nextmedia is Australia's foremost special interest digital and print media publisher, and has become the country's fourth-largest magazine publishing group.

nextmedia was established in 2008, as a new entrant to the special interest publishing sector. nextmedia was managed by CEO David Gardiner and Commercial Director Bruce Duncan until 2018, when Duncan retired, Hamish Bayliss was appointed Managing Director, and David Gardiner 'stepped back' to a role as Executive Chairman.

History
nextmedia was founded in 2007 by acquiring the publishing assets of four companies:
 Horwitz Publications (founded 1960)
 Next Publishing (founded 1987)
 Chevron Publishing Group (founded 1988)
 Bluewater Publishing (founded 2006)

In 2013, nextmedia itself was acquired by the Forum Media Group. Shortly thereafter, nextmedia acquired the assets of Haymarket Media Pty Ltd.

In 2018, consumer computing and tech assets (including Atomic, Hyper, PC PowerPlay, and PC Tech & Authority) were sold to Future plc.

Magazines

 Aero Australia
 Art Almanac
 Artist Profile
 Australian Camera
 Australian Guitar
 Australian Hi-Fi
 Australian InCar
 Australian Muscle Car
 Barra, Bass & Bream
 Bluewater
 F1 Racing
 FTBL
 Girl Power
 Golf Australia
 Healthy Food Guide
 Home Cinema & Hi-Fi Living
 Inside Sport
 Inside Cricket
 Little Angel
 Mad
 Mad Classics
 Mania
 Motor Racing Australia
 Old Bike 
 ProPhoto
 Soap World
 Sound+Image
 Tracks
 TV Soap
 V8 Supercars and V8 Bathurst

Websites
 CRN
 IT News
 MyMagazines
 AVHub

Out of print magazines
 N64 Gamer
 Internet.AU
 MAX Magazine
 Geare
 Smart Home Ideas
 PC & Tech Authority
 Official Australian PlayStation Magazine (first edition)
 PSW
 Total Gamer
 GBA World (2002–2004)
 Nintendo Gamer (2001–2003, 2007) *not to be confused with Nintendo Gamer (UK)
 Waves
 Blunt
 Yen

References

External links 
 

Australian companies established in 2007
Magazine publishing companies of Australia
2007 establishments in Australia
Mass media in Sydney